Charles Jay "Swin" Swindells (October 26, 1878 – July 22, 1940) played Major League baseball as a catcher for the St. Louis Cardinals in September, 1904. He went to Stanford University. He was the manager of the Community of the Northwestern League in 1907.

Sources

St. Louis Cardinals players
Major League Baseball catchers
1878 births
1940 deaths
Baseball players from Illinois
Minor league baseball managers
San Francisco A's players
Oakland Oaks (baseball) players
Anaconda Serpents players
Los Angeles Angels (minor league) players
Oakland Commuters players
Spokane Blue Stockings players
Tacoma Tigers players
Butte Miners players
Butte Fruit Pickers players
Portland Giants players
Savannah Pathfinders players
Nashville Vols players
Spokane Indians players
Sportspeople from Rockford, Illinois
Stanford Cardinal baseball players